The 2013 PTT Pattaya Open was a women's professional tennis tournament played on outdoor hard courts. It was the 22nd edition of the PTT Pattaya Open and was part of the International category on the 2013 WTA Tour. It took place at the Dusit Thani Hotel in Pattaya, Thailand from January 26 through February 3, 2013.

Singles main-draw entrants

Seeds 

1 Rankings as of January 14, 2013

Other entrants 
The following players received wildcards into the main draw:
 Daniela Hantuchová 
 Luksika Kumkhum  
 Varatchaya Wongteanchai

The following players received entry from the qualifying draw:
 Akgul Amanmuradova
 Bethanie Mattek-Sands
 Anastasia Rodionova
 Anastasija Sevastova

Withdrawals 
Before the tournament
 Polona Hercog
 Romina Oprandi  
 Laura Robson
 Vera Zvonareva

Retirements 
 Tímea Babos  (gastrointestinal illness)
 Irina-Camelia Begu (right shoulder injury)
 Daniela Hantuchová (dizziness)

Doubles main-draw entrants

Seeds 

1 Rankings are as of January 14, 2013

Other entrants 
The following pairs received wildcards into the main draw:
 Noppawan Lertcheewakarn /  Ksenia Palkina
 Nicha Lertpitaksinchai /  Peangtarn Plipuech
The following pair received entry as alternates:
 Varatchaya Wongteanchai /  Varunya Wongteanchai

Withdrawals 
Before the tournament
 Zheng Saisai (personal reasons)
During the tournament
 Tímea Babos (gastrointestinal illness)

Champions

Singles 

 Maria Kirilenko def.  Sabine Lisicki, 5–7, 6–1, 7–6(7–1)

Doubles 

 Kimiko Date-Krumm /  Casey Dellacqua def.  Akgul Amanmuradova /  Alexandra Panova, 6–3, 6–2

References

External links 
 

 
 WTA Tour
 in women's tennis
Tennis, WTA Tour, PTT Pattaya Open
Tennis, WTA Tour, PTT Pattaya Open

Tennis, WTA Tour, PTT Pattaya Open
Tennis, WTA Tour, PTT Pattaya Open